Leipaklei is a 2012 Indian Meitei language film directed and produced by Aribam Syam Sharma. It stars Leishangthem Tonthoi in the titular role. The story of the film was written by Arambam Samarendra and screenplay by Arambam Ongbi Memchoubi. Leipaklei was screened on the inaugural day of 5th Guwahati Film Festival 2012. It was also screened at the 18th Kolkata International Film Festival and Jeonju International Film Festival (JIFF) held at Jeonju, South Korea. The film won the National Film Award for Best Feature Film in Manipuri at the 60th National Film Awards.

Synopsis
The film Leipaklei tells the story of Leipaklei, a woman named after a Manipuri flower. Like the flower whose habitat is the hard ground, she is surrounded by hard trials and ironies of fate: separation from the one who loved and is still loved by her, abandonment by her husband, the trials of being a single parent, the violence of the gaze of men who sees her as fair game.
Not unlike the flower Leipaklei, which hibernates beneath parched grounds – dreaming for a spring past, the protagonist dreams of the return of her beloved. He returns.

Cast
 Leishangthem Tonthoi as Leipaklei
 Lairenjam Olen as Ibotomba
 Gurumayum Kalpana as Tamurei
 Thingom Pritam as Thoiba
 Gurumayum Priyogopal as Khura
 Sundari as Mandon
 Baby Rainy as Meme

Accolades 
Leipaklei won the National Film Award for Best Feature Film in Manipuri at the 60th National Film Awards. The citation for the National Award reads, "A simple story told in a straight-forward simple narrative highlighting social reality".

See also 

 List of Meitei-language films

References

2010s Meitei-language films
2012 films
Films directed by Aribam Syam Sharma